Bronson is a city located in west central Branch County in the U.S. state of Michigan.  The population was 2,349 at the 2010 census.

The ZIP code is 49028 and the FIPS place code is 10860.

The city is located within Bronson Township, though it is administratively autonomous.

History
A post office was established here under the name of Bronson's Prairie in 1830, with Jabez B. Bronson as post master.  When the village was started it was first named York, but was renamed to Bronson by the Michigan legislature in 1837.  The village was incorporated in 1866 and made a city in 1934.

Bronson established a new City Charter in 1985. This charter established the Council-Manager form of government under which Bronson still operates.

Government
The City of Bronson is governed by a five-member City Council. Members are elected at large by city residents in odd-year elections to either two or four-year terms. The Council elect, from among their members, a mayor and vice-mayor. Alicia Cole became mayor in January 2014 following the death of Tom Rissman, who had held the position since 2003. Cole is Rissman's eldest daughter. Larry McConn is the vice-mayor.

The City Council appoints a clerk/treasurer to oversee official records, voting, the collection of taxes, and the depositing of all city funds. Karen A. Smith was appointed to this role in 1983. Smith also holds the post of assessor for the city.

Charles Lillis of the firm Biringer, Hutchinson, Lillis, Bappert & Angell, PC serves as city attorney- a post he has held since 2011.

Geography

The North Bronson Industrial Area Superfund Sites are a group of three United States Environmental Protection Agency Superfund sites: the former Bronson Reel Facility, the former L.A. Darling Facility, and the former Scott Fetzer Facility.

Demographics

2010 census
As of the census of 2010, there were 2,349 people, 834 households, and 568 families residing in the city. The racial makeup of the city was 89.8% White, 0.8% African American, 0.6% Native American, 0.6% Asian, 6.2% from other races, and 2.1% from two or more races. Hispanic or Latino of any race were 15.4% of the population.

There were 834 households, of which 40.6% had children under the age of 18 living with them, 43.0% were married couples living together, 17.7% had a female householder with no husband present, 7.3% had a male householder with no wife present, and 31.9% were non-families. 26.6% of all households were made up of individuals, and 12.8% had someone living alone who was 65 years of age or older. The average household size was 2.80 and the average family size was 3.33.

The median age in the city was 30.8 years. 31.1% of residents were under the age of 18; 11.1% were between the ages of 18 and 24; 25.4% were from 25 to 44; 22.1% were from 45 to 64; and 10.3% were 65 years of age or older. The gender makeup of the city was 49.3% male and 50.7% female.

2000 census
As of the census of 2000, there were 2,421 people, 891 households, and 601 families residing in the city. The racial makeup of the city was 92.32% White, 0.58% African American, 0.54% Native American, 0.25% Asian, 4.42% from other races, and 1.90% from two or more races. Hispanic or Latino of any race were 8.51% of the population.

There were 891 households, out of which 37.0% had children under the age of 18 living with them, 47.8% were married couples living together, 15.8% had a female householder with no husband present, and 32.5% were non-families. 27.6% of all households were made up of individuals, and 14.9% had someone living alone who was 65 years of age or older.  The average household size was 2.71 and the average family size was 3.26.

In the city, the population was spread out, with 30.1% under the age of 18, 10.0% from 18 to 24, 28.4% from 25 to 44, 16.8% from 45 to 64, and 14.7% who were 65 years of age or older.  The median age was 32 years. For every 100 females, there were 90.9 males.  For every 100 females age 18 and over, there were 88.7 males.

The median income for a household in the city was $32,035, and the median income for a family was $42,813. Males had a median income of $29,702 versus $22,406 for females. The per capita income for the city was $17,023.  About 9.4% of families and 12.7% of the population were below the poverty line, including 15.8% of those under age 18 and 6.8% of those age 65 or over.

Notable people
Elizabeth Colwell, artist, born in Bronson

Sister cities
Moryń, Poland

References

External links
City of Bronson

Populated places established in 1830
Cities in Branch County, Michigan
Superfund sites in Michigan
1830 establishments in Michigan Territory